Banco de Bogotá  (English: Bank of Bogotá) is the first commercial bank established in Colombia.

Overview 

Founded in 1870, Banco de Bogotá is the oldest commercial banking institution in Colombia, and operates through approximately 650 branches, five corporate service centers and a banking attention center in the country. On a national level, it also operates through subsidiaries: Corporacion Financiera Colombiana S.A., an investment bank; Almacenes Generales de Deposito Almaviva S.A., a products supply logistics company; Sociedad Fiduciaria Bogotá Fidubogotá S.A. and Fiduciaria del Comercio Fiducomercio S.A., trust and portfolio investment companies; Leasing Bogotá S.A., a leasing company; Valores Bogotá S.A., a provider of brokerage services; and Fondos de Pensiones y Cesantias Porvenir, a pensions and suspensions administrator. It also owns bank subsidiaries in Panama and the Bahamas. In the United States, Banco de Bogotá operates two agencies, one in New York City, New York, and one in Miami, Florida.

Grupo Aval, a holding company which is one of the largest and most influential financial entities in Colombia, owns a majority of the Bank's outstanding voting shares.

Its actual president is Alejandro Figueroa who has been in this position since 1989.

Software implementation 

On June 20, 2006, Fidelity National Information Services (FIS), Inc. announced the successful implementation of its retail lending software package, Advanced Lending Solution (ALS) – Servicing Manager at Banco de Bogotá. The efforts of the bank's technical consultants and FIS experts enabled Banco de Bogotá to be the first financial institution in its market to introduce a new personal loan product, Prestamo Personal Libre Destino.

Banco de Bogotá has utilized FIS' deposits, savings, financial management and architecture to support its retail banking operations since 1988. Following a change in local banking regulations in the fourth quarter of 2005, the bank needed to upgrade its lending system quickly to launch a new consumer loan product into the market. Banco de Bogotá introduced the new product in February, ahead of its competitors, and captured a significant share of the market.

The bank selected FIS' ALS-Servicing Manager, a customizable loan processing application that supports customer and account servicing requirements for the life of the loan. The Banco de Bogotá team quickly adjusted the features for the Prestamo Personal Libre Destino, using ALS-Servicing Manager's real-time product parameter facility, to select processing options that addressed interest accruals, late charges and payment posting options. The Bank expected to attract 3,000 new customers a month with this new personal loan product. It is also planning a follow-up phase, which will utilize ALS-Servicing Manager for a new line of credit product and add additional inquiry transaction functionality for the teller system.

Regulation 
Banco de Bogotá is supervised by the Colombian Superintendency of Banking, which is primarily responsible for the regulation and supervision of Colombian financial institutions, including their foreign offices, subsidiaries, and affiliates. The Superintendency issues and promulgates supervisory regulations concerning accounting requirements, asset quality, management, operations, capital adequacy, loan classification and loan loss provision standards. In addition, the Superintendency monitors compliance by financial institutions with applicable laws and regulations and may order preventive measures and impose sanctions on financial institutions.

Gallery 
<div class="center">

Notes 

Banks of Colombia
Companies based in Bogotá
Companies listed on the Colombia Stock Exchange
Banks established in 1870
Privately held companies of Colombia
Colombian brands